The following table lists the 100 largest bank holding companies in the United States ranked by total assets of September 30, 2022 per the Federal Financial Institutions Examination Council; their market capitalization is also shown. This list does not include some large commercial banks, which are not holding companies.

As of September 30, 2022, there were 4,157 commercial banks in the U.S. insured by the Federal Deposit Insurance Corporation (FDIC) with US$23.6 trillion in assets.

Banks listed amongst the 100 largest by the Federal Reserve but not the Federal Financial Institutions Examination Council, because they are not holding companies, are as follows:

 First Republic Bank ($197.91 billion in assets)
 Signature Bank ($115.97 billion in assets) (defunct: March 2023)
 City National Bank ($91.12 billion in assets)
 Zions Bancorporation ($87.78 billion in assets)
 Bank OZK ($25.92 billion in assets)

See also
 List of largest banks
 Banking in the United States
 List of largest banks in the Americas
 List of largest banks in North America
 List of largest banks in Latin America
 List of largest banks in India

References

 Lists
Banking in the United States
Largest